Studyonovsky is a rural locality (a khutor) in Dobrinskoye Rural Settlement, Uryupinsky District, Volgograd Oblast, Russia. The population was 29 as of 2010.

Geography 
Studyonovsky is located 25 km northwest of Uryupinsk (the district's administrative centre) by road. Topolyovsky is the nearest rural locality.

References 

Rural localities in Uryupinsky District